Joseph Alban D'Souza was an Indian politician. He had been mayor of Bombay in 1945–1946 and member of the Constituent Assembly of India representing Bombay to write the Constitution of India, and serve as its first Parliament as an independent nation.

He also was a three-term member of Standing Committee and its chairman. Chairman of Public Health Commission.

References 

1878 births
1964 deaths
People from North Goa district
Members of the Constituent Assembly of India
Mayors of Mumbai